Edward Nugent Leeson, 6th Earl of Milltown, KP, PC (I) (9 October 1835 – 30 May 1890), was an Anglo-Irish peer. 

He was the second son of Joseph Leeson, 4th Earl of Milltown and his wife Barbara, dowager Lady Caste Coote, daughter of Sir Joshua Colles Meredyth, 8th Baronet.

Life 
Educated at Trinity College, Dublin, he was called to the Bar at the Inner Temple in 1862. On the death of his elder brother Joseph Leeson, 5th Earl of Milltown in 1871, he succeeded to his family's peerage then being elected on 23 August 1881 as an Irish representative peer, allowing him to sit in the House of Lords.
Lord Lieutenant of Wicklow from 14 June 1887, in 1889 Lord Milltown became an Honorary Commissioner in lunacy, and was also appointed a Knight of St. Patrick on 7 February 1890, shortly before his death.

He married, in 1871, Lady Geraldine Stanhope, daughter of the Leicester Stanhope, 5th Earl of Harrington, but had no issue. 

On his death, the title passed to his brother Henry Leeson who died a year later when the title fell dormant (pending any claim by Robert Leeson's descendants).

See also
 Earl of Milltown
 Irish House of Lords

References

1835 births
1890 deaths
19th-century Anglo-Irish people
Alumni of Trinity College Dublin
Members of the Inner Temple
Members of the Privy Council of Ireland
Irish representative peers
Lord-Lieutenants of Wicklow
Knights of St Patrick
Earls of Milltown